Mount Glenn is a  elevation glaciated summit located  northwest of Valdez in the Chugach Mountains of the U.S. state of Alaska. It is part of the Dora Keen Range, which is a 25-miles-long divide separating Harvard Glacier from Yale Glacier. The mountain's name was applied in 1911 by Lawrence Martin, and officially adopted in 1930 by the U.S. Board on Geographic Names to honor Edwin Forbes Glenn (1857–1926), an Army officer who explored this College Fjord area in 1898. The Glenn Highway is also named for this same person.

Climate

Based on the Köppen climate classification, Mount Glenn is located in a subarctic climate zone with long, cold, snowy winters, and mild summers. Weather systems coming off the Gulf of Alaska are forced upwards by the Chugach Mountains (orographic lift), causing heavy precipitation in the form of rainfall and snowfall. Temperatures can drop below −20 °C with wind chill factors below −30 °C. This climate supports the Harvard and Yale Glaciers surrounding this mountain. The months May through June offer the most favorable weather for climbing or viewing.

See also

List of mountain peaks of Alaska
Geography of Alaska
Mount Castner

References

External links
 Weather: Mount Glenn
 National Weather Service Forecast

Glenn
Glenn
North American 2000 m summits